BNPP may refer to:

Bataan Nuclear Power Plant
Belarusian Nuclear Power Plant
Barisan Nasional Pembebasan Patani
BNP Paribas
bis (p-nitrophenyl)phosphate, an enzyme inhibitor of the organophosphate class